FPG may refer to:

 Fasting plasma glucose
 Fisher Poets Gathering, an American poetry festival
 Formamidopyrimidine DNA glycosylase
 Formosa Plastics Group, a Taiwanese conglomerate 
 Fragmenta Philosophorum Graecorum, a collection of fragments of ancient Greek philosophical texts
 Frederick Philip Grove (1879–1948), German-born Canadian novelist and translator.
 Galician People's Front, a regional political party in Spain

 Federal Poverty Guidelines (in the US)